Samuel Augustus Bridges (January 27, 1802 – January 14, 1884) was a Democratic member of the U.S. House of Representatives from Pennsylvania.

Samuel A. Bridges was born in Colchester, Connecticut.  He pursued an academic course, and was graduated from Williams College in Williamstown, Massachusetts, in 1826.  He studied law, was admitted to the bar in 1829 and commenced practice in Doylestown, Pennsylvania.  He moved to Allentown, Pennsylvania, in 1830, where he continued the practice of law.  He served as town clerk from 1837 to 1842, and deputy attorney general of the State for Lehigh County, Pennsylvania, from 1837 to 1844.  He was a delegate to the Democratic State convention in 1841.

Bridges was elected as a Democrat to the Thirtieth Congress to fill the vacancy caused by the death of John W. Hornbeck.  He was not a candidate for renomination in 1848.  He was again elected to the Thirty-third Congress, but was an unsuccessful candidate for reelection in 1854.   He resumed the practice of law, and was again elected to the Forty-fifth Congress.  He was not a candidate for renomination in 1878.  He continued the practice of law in Allentown where he died in 1884.  Interment in Union Cemetery.

Sources

The Political Graveyard

1802 births
1884 deaths
Politicians from Allentown, Pennsylvania
Pennsylvania lawyers
Democratic Party members of the United States House of Representatives from Pennsylvania
19th-century American politicians
Williams College alumni
19th-century American lawyers